Salagnac is a commune in the Dordogne department in Nouvelle-Aquitaine in southwestern France.

History
During the creation of the French departments in 1790, it first joined the Corrèze department. In 1793 it became part of the Dordogne department.

Population

See also
Communes of the Dordogne department

References

Communes of Dordogne
Arrondissement of Périgueux